The Minimus books are a series of school textbooks, written by Barbara Bell, illustrated by Dr. Helen Forte, and published by the Cambridge University Press, designed to help children of primary school age to learn Latin. The books espouse some of the principles of the direct method of language teaching, and are named after the mouse Minimus (Latin for "smallest", and also a pun on mus — Latin for "mouse") who is known as "The mouse that made Latin cool".  There are two books in the series: Minimus: Starting out in Latin and Minimus Secundus. While the first book is aimed at 7-10 year olds, the second continues the series for children up to 13 years old. 

The stories presented in each chapter revolve around a family. The family is based on a real family who lived at the Roman fort of Vindolanda in northern Britain in 100 AD. The books feature many artifacts from Vindolanda, integrating real objects into fictional plot lines.

In 2011, it was reported that 125,000 copies had been sold.

Regular characters

Minimus, a mouse
Vibrissa (Latin for Whisker), the family cat 
Flavius, the father and fort commander of Vindolanda
Lepidina, the mother
Flavia, the daughter
Iulius, the older son
Rufus, the youngest child of the family
Corinthus, a Greek slave who is excellent at reading and writing
Candidus, a British slave who is very good at cooking
Pandora, a slave girl who is a hairdresser
Trifosa, Pandoras replacement

Italian version

In 2007, the Minimus books were adapted for Italian pupils.  As a single volume, the material is aimed at an older audience. The setting of the stories is altered to several European locations and there is considerably more formal grammar and exercises, in line with Italian teaching methods.

See also
Cambridge Latin Course

References

External links
Minimus website

Education in the United Kingdom
Latin textbooks